The Rocky Mountain Arsenal National Wildlife Refuge is a  National Wildlife Refuge located adjacent to Denver and Commerce City, Colorado, in the United States. The refuge is on the grounds of the former Rocky Mountain Arsenal, a United States Army chemical weapons manufacturing facility. The site was designated a national wildlife refuge in 1992 by the United States Congress, and underwent a costly environmental cleanup in order to remove pollutants. The refuge is managed by the United States Fish and Wildlife Service. More than 330 species of wildlife inhabit the refuge, including raptors, deer, raccoons, coyotes, white pelicans,  black-footed ferrets, black-tailed prairie dogs, and bison.

Previous uses
The Rocky Mountain Arsenal (RMA) was built in 1942 to manufacture chemical weapons. A portion of the site was leased to private industry in 1946 for petroleum production and agricultural and industrial chemical manufacturing. When the American chemical weapons program was shut down after the Vietnam War, the RMA served as a site for dismantling and disposing of these weapons. The Shell Oil Company also used a portion of the site in the 1980s to produce pesticides. The RMA was closed in 1985, and in 1987 environmental testing revealed that the site was extremely polluted. The RMA was listed on the National Priorities List, a list of hazardous waste sites in the United States eligible for long-term remedial action (cleanup) financed under the federal Superfund program run by the Environmental Protection Agency.

In 1986, while environmental testing was continuing, a winter communal roost of bald eagles, then an endangered species, was discovered at the Rocky Mountain Arsenal. Additional investigation by the U.S. Fish and Wildlife Service (USFWS) discovered that the RMA was home more than 330 species of wildlife. With the arsenal not fit for human habitation, pressure quickly built to have it turned into a wildlife refuge. Congress enacted the Rocky Mountain Arsenal National Wildlife Refuge Act on September 25, 1992, and the legislation was signed into law by President George H. W. Bush on October 9. The law stipulated that a majority of the RMA site would become a national wildlife refuge under the jurisdiction of the Fish and Wildlife Service once the environmental restoration is completed.  The Act also provided that, to the extent possible, the RMA was to be managed as a wildlife refuge in the interim.

Not all of this land was set aside for the refuge. Section 5(a)(1) of the act designated another  for public sale. The former Shell Oil Company land also proved to be a problem, as it was somewhat geographically isolated from the rest of the refuge and not likely to be used by wildlife as habitat. Of the remaining  of the Shell site,  are (as of 2013) being used for a water treatment facility and another  for domestic livestock grazing. The USFWS anticipates selling these  by 2023.

History
The entire  of the old RMA was included in the remediation effort. On January 21, 2003, the Environmental Protection Agency (EPA) certified  as ready for use, and this acreage was turned over to the USFWS. Another  were certified clean on January 15, 2004. This allowed USWFS to formally open the Rocky Mountain Arsenal National Wildlife Refuge on April 2, 2004. EPA released another  on July 31, 2006. The remaining  were declared contaminant-free and turned over to the refuge on October 15, 2010. The total cost of the cleanup was $2.1 billion.

Sixteen American bison were brought from the National Bison Range in Montana to an enclosed  section of the refuge in March 2007 as part of the USFWS Pilot Bison Project. The number of bison reached 87 in 2013, forcing the USFWS to reduce the herd to just 60 animals as the limited acreage could not support so many animals.

The conservation of bison is an ongoing, diverse effort to bring bison back from the brink of extinction. The 2020 Bison Conservation Initiative by the Department of the Interior has five central goals: wild, healthy bison herds; genetic conservation; shared stewardship; ecological restoration; and cultural restoration. It strengthened mechanisms for delivery of bison to Native American tribes from federal herds. Excess bison from 2021 roundup were donated to the Wolakota Buffalo Range and for the first time Indigenous peoples joined refuge staff for the roundup. Six yearling female bison were also transferred from the Refuge to Theodore Roosevelt National Park, where National Park Service experts will study the extent to which translocated animals integrate into established herds.

The refuge's Visitor Center opened on May 21, 2011. About two-thirds of the refuge consists of mixed-grass and shortgrass prairie, while the remainder is a mix of forest, shrubland, and lakes, streams, and riparian areas. A large number of man-made features dot the landscape, including irrigation ditches, lakes and ponds, and former homesteads. Beginning in 2011, the USFWS began implementing a plan to remove invasive plant species and restore native plants on most of the refuge. As of 2013, the USFWS had identified 332 species of wildlife on the refuge. Most of these species exist only in very low numbers.

Management

All land included in the Rocky Mountain Arsenal National Wildlife Refuge was turned over to the Department of the Interior with management of the refuge being the responsibility of both the USFWS and the U.S. Army. Some land may still contain chemical weapons devices (such as unexploded projectiles or buried equipment) and cannot safely be integrated into the wildlife refuge, so the Fish & Wildlife Service manages  of land. The remainder of the property is managed by the U.S. Army. The USFWS and Army signed an inter-agency agreement to cooperate in the management of the Army land according to UWFWS principles.

A Comprehensive Management Plan for the refuge was finalized in June 1996. Under the plan, the refuge is available for public use, and community outreach and educational programs will be implemented to encourage public use.

A record 300,000 people visited the refuge in 2013, and refuge officials say they expect visitation to top one million annually once visitor facilities, outreach plans, and a wildlife management plan are completely in place.

See also 
 National Eagle Repository
 Involuntary park

References

Bibliography

National Wildlife Refuges in Colorado
Protected areas of Adams County, Colorado
Commerce City, Colorado
Great Plains
Protected areas established in 1992
Bison herds
Rewilding